Katrina Adams and Manon Bollegraf were the defending champions, but they retired in the quarterfinals against Mélanie Bernard and Caroline Delisle.

Elna Reinach and Nathalie Tauziat won the title, defeating Linda Harvey-Wild and Chanda Rubin 6–4, 6–3 in the final.

Seeds

Draw

References
Main Draw

Challenge Bell
Tournoi de Québec
Can